Jules Marie Lebreton (Tours 1873-1956) was professor of the History of Christian Origins at the Faculty of Catholic Theology, Paris.

References

1873 births
1956 deaths
Contributors to the Catholic Encyclopedia